Andrés Artuñedo Martínavarro (born 14 September 1993), known as Andrés Artuñedo, is a tennis player from Spain.

Artuñedo has reached a career high ATP singles ranking of World No. 293 achieved on 3 March 2014. He has also reached a career high ATP doubles ranking of World No. 267 achieved on 24 June 2019.

Artuñedo, with partner Roberto Carballés won the Boys' Doubles event on the 2011 French Open. They defeated Mitchell Krueger and Shane Vinsant 5–7, 7–6, [10–5] in the final. He was the top climber of 2011 ATP rankings starting in number 1182 and finishing 486th.

Artuñedo made his ATP Tour singles debut at the 2014 Open Sud de France on hard courts in Montpellier. Granted acceptance into the qualifying draw, he successfully defeated Alessandro Bega 6–3 6–7(7–4), followed by Niels Desein 6–4, 3–6, 7–6(7–4) and lastly Vincent Millot 3–6, 7–6(7–1), 6–3 to earn a main draw birth. In the first round, he faced French wild card Pierre-Hugues Herbert and was defeated in straight sets 4–6, 3–6.

Artuñedo had reached 23 career singles finals with a record of 14 wins and 9 losses all appearing on hard courts on the ITF Futures Tour. Additionally, he has reached 17 career doubles finals with a record of 9 wins and 8 losses, with includes a 1–0 record in ATP Challenger Tour finals which represents his title victory at the 2018 Segovia Challenger in Spain where alongside David Pérez Sanz they defeated Matías Franco Descotte and Joao Monteiro 6–7(3–7), 6–3, [10–6] to capture the championship.

ATP Challenger and ITF Futures finals

Singles: 23 (14–9)

Doubles: 17 (9–8)

Junior Grand Slam finals

Doubles: 1 (1 title)

Sources

External links
 
 

1993 births
Living people
Spanish male tennis players
Sportspeople from Castellón de la Plana
French Open junior champions
Grand Slam (tennis) champions in boys' doubles
Tennis players from the Valencian Community